Bill Bergson, Master Detective may refer to:
 Bill Bergson, Master Detective (novel), a children's novel by Astrid Lindgren
 Bill Bergson, Master Detective (film), a 1947 Swedish film